Kaimar-ud-Din bin Maidin (3 July 1942 – 19 April 2009) was a Malaysian athlete. He competed in the men's long jump at the 1960 Summer Olympics.

References

External links
 

1942 births
2009 deaths
Athletes (track and field) at the 1960 Summer Olympics
Malaysian male long jumpers
Olympic athletes of Malaya
Athletes (track and field) at the 1962 Asian Games
People from Terengganu
Asian Games competitors for Malaysia
Southeast Asian Games medalists in athletics
Southeast Asian Games gold medalists for Malaysia